Bimalgarh Junction railway station is a railway station on the South Eastern Railway network in the state of Odisha, India. It serves Bimalgarh village. Its code is BUF. It has one platform. Passenger trains halt at Bimalgarh Junction railway station.

See also
 Sundergarh district

References

Railway stations in Sundergarh district
Chakradharpur railway division